Chiloé may refer to:
 Chiloé Archipelago in Chile
 Chiloé Province, administrative division that covers most of the archipelago
 Chiloé Island the main island of the archipelago, contained in the province
 Chiloé National Park on the island
 Chiloé Block, a geological tectonic unit 
 Chiloe Wigeon